The 1951–52 Copa Federación de España was the fourth staging (old competition) of the Copa Federación de España, a knockout competition for Spanish football clubs in Segunda División and Tercera División.

The competition began on 20 April 1952 and ended with the final on 15 June 1952, where Jaén became champion after defeating Orensana.

Qualified teams
The following teams competed in the 1951–52 Copa Federación de España:

9 teams of 1951–52 Segunda División:

10 teams of 1951–52 Tercera División:

Competition

First round

|}

Second round

|}

Third round

|}

Semi-finals

|}

Final

|}

References

External links
 at Rfef.es

Copa Federación de España seasons
Fed